Amber Sikosang Yobech (born January 27, 1991) is a Palauan swimmer, who specialized in sprint freestyle events. At age seventeen, she became one of the youngest swimmers to mark their Olympic debut at the 2008 Summer Olympics in Beijing. Swimming in heat three of the women's 50 m freestyle, Yobech threw down her personal best in 30.00 seconds to claim the third spot in a splash-and-dash-finish. Yobech failed to advance to the semifinals, as she placed seventy-first overall out of ninety-two entrants in the prelims.

References

External links
 
NBC Olympics Profile

1991 births
Living people
Palauan female swimmers
Olympic swimmers of Palau
Swimmers at the 2008 Summer Olympics
Palauan female freestyle swimmers